Thoma Avrami (1869–1943) was an Albanian poet, journalist and activist of the Albanian National Awakening. During his life he published many distinguished Albanian newspapers and magazines of the era like Përlindja Shqiptare, Besa and Vetëtima.

Life 

Thoma Avrami was born in Görice, Ottoman Empire (today Korçë) in 1869. After migrating to Romania he joined Drita, the most important organization of the Albanians of Romania and became one of the editors of its newspaper, where he also published some of his early lyrical poems. Later he became one of the editors Albania. In 1889 he became one of the first teachers of the first Albanian school of Korçë. In 1903 he started publishing the biweekly magazine Përlindja Shqiptare and coined the motto Shqipëria Shqiptarëve later adopted by Balli Kombëtar as its official motto. Along with Foqion Turtulli he published in Cairo the newspaper Besa in 1904. In 1908 he was one of the delegates of Korçë in the Congress of Monastir.

Bibliography 

Notes

References 

1869 births
1943 deaths
Activists of the Albanian National Awakening
19th-century Albanian writers
People from Korçë
People from Manastir vilayet
19th-century Albanian poets
20th-century Albanian poets
Albanian educators
Albanian expatriates in Egypt
Albanian expatriates in Romania